No. 122 Helicopter Flight (Dolphins) is a fighter squadron and is equipped with Mil Mi-8 and based at Car Nicobar AFS.

History

Assignments

Aircraft
Mi-8/8T
Mi-17V5

References

122